Omid Ravankhah (born April 13, 1986) is a retired Iranian football player and now coach. He played as a midfielder when he was a football player.

Club career 
Ravankhah joined Esteghlal in 2007. He has scored several key goals for Esteghlal, including two goals against classical rivals Persepolis F.C. so he got named as "امید رفت و برگشت" which translates to 'home and away Omid.' In the first game of the 2008/2009 season he received a serious injury putting him out for several months. Ravankhah played for Esteghlal in the AFC Champions League group stage, appearing against Al-Ittihad on 11 March 2009. He officially announced his retirement on 12 May 2013 at the age of 25, because of his serious old injury.

Club career statistics

 Assist Goals

Honours

Club
Iran's Premier Football League
Winner: 1
2008–09 with Esteghlal
Runner up: 1
2010–11 with Esteghlal
Hazfi Cup
Winner:1
 2007–08 with Esteghlal

References

Iranian footballers
Association football midfielders
Fajr Sepasi players
Esteghlal F.C. players
Saipa F.C. players
1985 births
Living people
Iranian football managers